Ilaka Est is a rural commune (municipality) located in the Atsinanana region of eastern Madagascar, and belongs to the Vatomandry (district).

This town is situated on the eastern coast of Madagascar, in the southern part of Atsinanana, on the banks of the Manampotsy river and is located on the National road 11a.

The economy is based on agriculture, including coffee and cacao but also rice, maize and manioc.

References

Populated places in Atsinanana